Philip Klein (May 22, 1849 – March 21, 1926) was a Hungarian-born rabbi who ministered in the Russian Empire and America.

Life 
Klein was born on May 22, 1849 in Baracska, Hungary, the son of Hermann Klein.

Klein began studying at the Pressburg Yeshiva when he was twelve and spent the next four years there. He then went to Azriel Hildesheimer's Yeshiva in Halberstadt when he was sixteen. He was appointed dean of a department in the Yeshiva shortly afterwards and spent two years there. He then went to Vienna, and in 1868 he entered the gymnasium there. He later studied at the University of Vienna. With the encouragement of Hildesheimer (who by then became Chief Rabbi of Berlin), he moved to Berlin, Germany and enrolled in the Hildesheimer Rabbinical Seminary and the University of Berlin. He received his rabbinical ordination in 1871 and a Ph.D. from the University of Berlin in 1873. He spent some time as an instructor at the University of Berlin, and then accepted a position as tutor for the son of Israel Brodsky in Kyiv, Russia. His rabbinical diploma was conferred by Rabbi Benjamin Hirsch Auerbach of Halberstadt.   

Klein lived in Kyiv from 1874 to 1880. He then served as Rabbi of Libau, Courland from 1880 to 1890. In 1890, he immigrated to America and lived in New York City, New York. There, he was appointed rabbi of Congregation Ohab Zedek, an important Hungarian congregation in the Lower East Side. He served as rabbi there until his death. He was a founder of the war relief movement in the United States when World War I began in 1914. He was a leader of Agudath Israel and president of Agudath Israel of America when he died, although he wasn't entirely separated from Mizrachi Zionism. He was also honorary president of the Union of Orthodox Rabbis of the United States and Canada and president of Kollel Shomrei HaChomos. He remained in charge of Congregation Ohab Zedek after it merged with Pincus Elijah in 1923.   

Klein married Julie Hirsch, daughter of educator Mendel Hirsch and granddaughter of Rabbi Samson Raphael Hirsch, in around 1881. She served as vice-president of the Women's Branch of the Union of Orthodox Jewish Congregations of America and honorary president of the Sisterhood of Congregation Ohab Zedek, conducted a Talmud Torah in the Lower East Side for over 200 children, and organized the Julie Hirsch Klein Benevolent Society. Their children were Leo, Samson, Marcus, David, Rafael, Emanuel, Mrs. Harriet Lunzer, and Elizabeth. She grew sick from pneumonia while taking care of her husband, who was dying of the same disease. She died less than 48 hours after Klein, and was never told about his death.   

Klein died at home on March 21, 1926. As per his last wishes, his body wasn't taken to a synagogue during his funeral and no eulogies were made. Thousands of people attended his funeral, and 300 rabbis, headed by Rabbi M. Margulies and Rabbi Isaiah Levy, took turns carrying the coffin during the funeral procession. He was buried in Washington Cemetery.

References 

1849 births
1926 deaths
19th-century Hungarian Jews
19th-century Hungarian rabbis
American people of Hungarian-Jewish descent
University of Vienna alumni
Hildesheimer Rabbinical Seminary alumni
Humboldt University of Berlin alumni
19th-century rabbis from the Russian Empire
People from Liepāja
19th-century Latvian Jews
Latvian rabbis
Austro-Hungarian emigrants to the Russian Empire
Hungarian emigrants to the United States
Orthodox rabbis from New York City
19th-century American rabbis
20th-century American rabbis
Hungarian Orthodox rabbis
Latvian Orthodox rabbis
People from the Lower East Side
Deaths from pneumonia in New York City
Burials in New York (state)